The Venus of Eliseevichi is a Venus figurine from the Epigravettian exhibited at the Hermitage Museum.

The figurine was discovered in 1930, near the Sudost River in the Bryansk region of Russia. It is 15 cm high and was carved from mammoth ivory. Remarkably, the figurine depicts a young woman, just like the Venus impudique. 

Although the figurine is assigned to the 'Venus' category, the statuette does not appear to be stylistically similar to other Russian Paleolithic figurines (such as the Venus figurines of Kostenki or the Venus figurines of Gagarino).

Literature 
 Henri Delporte: L’image de la femme dans l’art préhistorique, Ed. Picard 1979.

References

External links 
 Description and pictures of the Venus of Eliseevichi

Venus figurines
Gravettian
Ivory works of art
European archaeology
Culture of Bryansk Oblast
Archaeological discoveries in Russia
History of Bryansk Oblast